Visiedo is a municipality located in the province of Teruel, Aragon, Spain. According to the 2004 census (INE), the municipality had a population of 188 inhabitants.

The Plains of Visiedo are part of the Sierra de San Just geographic area.

References

Municipalities in the Province of Teruel